Çelikler Holding is a conglomerate in Turkey with businesses in construction, concrete production, energy, and mining services. Due to its coal-fired power stations in Turkey it is a large private sector greenhouse gas emitter in Turkey and is on the Global Coal Exit List. 

Çelikler Seyitömer Electricity Generation Co. owns the coal-fired Afşin-Elbistan A, Orhaneli, Seyitömer and Tunçbilek power stations.

References 

Conglomerate companies of Turkey
Holding companies of Turkey
Companies based in Ankara
Coal companies of Turkey
Electric power companies of Turkey